The Speaker of the Jharkhand Legislative Assembly is the presiding officer of the Legislative Assembly of Jharkhand, the main law-making body for the Indian state of Jharkhand. The Speaker is elected in the very first meeting of the Jharkhand Legislative Assembly after the general elections for a term of 5 years from amongst the members of the assembly. Speakers holds office until ceasing to be a member of the assembly or resignation from the office. The Speaker can be removed from office by a resolution passed in the assembly by an effective majority of its members. In the absence of Speaker, the meeting of Jharkhand Legislative Assembly is presided by the Deputy Speaker.

Rabindra Nath Mahato is the current Speaker of the Jharkhand Legislative Assembly.

Eligibility
Speaker of the Assembly must:

 Be a citizen of India;
 Not be less than 25 years of age; and
 Not hold any office of profit under the Government of Jharkhand.

Powers and Functions of the Speaker
The speaker of the legislative assembly conducts the business in house, and decides whether a bill is a money bill or not.  They maintain discipline and decorum in the house and can punish a member for their unruly behaviour by suspending them. They also permit the moving of various kinds of motions and resolutions such as a motion of no confidence, motion of adjournment, motion of censure and calling attention notice as per the rules. The speaker decides on the agenda to be taken up for discussion during the meeting. The date of election of the speaker is fixed by the Governor of Jharkhand. Further, all comments and speeches made by members of the House are addressed to the speaker. The speaker is answerable to the house. Both the speaker and deputy speaker may be removed by a resolution passed by the majority of the members.

List of the Speakers of Jharkhand

See also
 Government of Jharkhand
 Governor of Jharkhand
 Chief Minister of Jharkhand
 Jharkhand Legislative Assembly
 Leader of the Opposition in the Jharkhand Legislative Assembly
 Cabinet of Jharkhand
 Chief Justice of Jharkhand
 Speaker of the Lok Sabha
 Chairman of the Rajya Sabha
 List of current Indian legislative speakers and chairmen

References

Lists of legislative speakers in India
Speakers of the Jharkhand Legislative Assembly
Jharkhand-related lists